Fleischkuekle (also Fleischkuechle, from Alemannic/South Franconian and East Franconian Fleischküchle, "little meat pie") is a deep-fried turnover similar to Crimean Tatar cheburek. The dish is a traditional Black Sea Germans / Crimea Germans recipe, and through immigration became an addition to the cuisine of North Dakota. This dish is popular among the many Russian-German immigrant families of North Dakota.

The dish is particularly common at main-street diners, especially in Mercer County, North Dakota, and on menus at fraternal organizations around the state.

Fleischkuekle is typically served hot from a deep fryer. Hot oil may pool inside when the breading is incompletely sealed, making it a sensible precaution to poke and drain any excess before eating.

In Mercer County, diners typically provide pickles and ketchup on the side. The dish is served with gravy in Fargo. A slice of cheese on top is not an uncommon request.

See also
 List of stuffed dishes
 Bierock
 Runza

References

External links
Fleischkuekle Recipe - North Dakota State University
 Fleischkuekle Recipe - desktopbookbook.com

Cuisine of the Midwestern United States
Savoury pies
German-American cuisine
German-Russian culture in South Dakota
German-Russian culture in North Dakota